Bilinear transformation may refer to:
 Bilinear map or bilinear operator
 Bilinear transform (signal processing), a type of conformal map used to switch between continuous-time and discrete-time representations
 Möbius transformation (complex analysis): a rational function of the form f(z) = (az + b) / (cz + d)

See also
 Bilinear (disambiguation)